Erethistoides pipri is a species of South Asian river catfish endemic to India where it is found in the Rihand and Sone Rivers.  This species grows to a length of  SL.

References
 

Erethistidae
Fish of Asia
Fish of India
Fish described in 1950
Taxa named by Sunder Lal Hora